McEntyre is a surname. Notable people with the surname include:

Kenneth McEntyre (born 1944), English cricketer
Kenny McEntyre (born 1970), American football player
William McEntyre Dye (1831–1899), American soldier

See also
McIntyre
McEntyre, Alabama, an unincorporated community